King of the Underworld is a 1952 British crime film directed by Victor M. Gover and starring Tod Slaughter, Patrick Barr and Tucker McGuire. It was followed by a sequel Murder at Scotland Yard. It was made at Bushey Studios with sets designed by the art director Don Chaffey.

Plot summary
A master criminal is hunted by the police after committing a series of crimes.

Cast
 Tod Slaughter as Terence Reilly
 Patrick Barr as Inspector Morley
 Tucker McGuire as Eileen Trotter
 Ingeborg von Kusserow as Marie
 Frank Hawkins as Inspector Cranshaw
 Leonard Sharp as Mullins
 Anne Valery as Susan

References

External links
 
 

1952 films
1952 crime films
Films directed by Victor M. Gover
British crime films
British black-and-white films
Films set in London
1950s English-language films
1950s British films